Fortuynia may refer to:
 Fortuynia (mite), a genus of mites in the family Fortuyniidae
 Fortuynia (plant), a genus of plants in the family Brassicaceae